The year 1660 in music involved some significant events.

Events
Dieterich Buxtehude becomes organist at Helsingør in Denmark.
Pelham Humphrey and John Blow become members of the Chapel Royal.

Publications 

 Johann Crüger – Musicae Practicae
 Nicolas Fleury – Methode pour apprendre facilement a toucher le theorbe sur la basse-continuë
 Tommaso Marchetti – Intavolatura della chitarra spagnola

Classical music
Johann Rudolf Ahle – Erstes Zehn Neuer Geistlicher Arien
Christoph Bernhard – Fürchtet euch nicht
Samuel Capricornus – Jubilus Bernhardi
Maurizio Cazzati – Trattenimenti per camera, Op.22
Giovanni Legrenzi – Sentimenti devoti, Op.6
Matthew Locke – Consort of Four Parts
Giovanni Antonio Pandolfi Mealli (1624-1687)
Sonate a violino solo, per chiesa e camera, Op. 3 (Innsbruck: Michael Wagner)
Sonate a violino solo, per chiesa e camera, Op. 4 (Innsbruck: Michael Wagner)
Marco Uccellini 
Ozio Regio, Op.7
Sinfonie Boscarecie, Op. 8
Bauyn Manuscript

Opera
Antonio Bertali – La magia delusa
Francesco Cavalli – Xerxès
Juan Hidalgo de Polanco – Celos aun del aire matan
Francesco Manelli – La filo
Francesco Rossi – L'Arianna
Giuseppe Tricarico – L'Oronie
Filippo Vismarri – L'Orontea
Pietro Andrea Ziani – L'Antigona delusa da Alceste

Births
April 6 – Johann Kuhnau, organist and composer (died 1722)
April 19 – Sebastián Durón, composer of stage music (died 1716)
May 2 – Alessandro Scarlatti, Italian composer (died 1725)
August 20 – Mathieu Lanes, composer and harpsichordist (died 1725)
December 4 (baptized) – André Campra, French composer (died 1744)
date unknown 
Rosa Giacinta Badalla, Italian composer and nun (died c. 1710)
Johann Joseph Fux, composer (died 1741)

Deaths
March 2 (buried) – Friederich Stellwagen, organ builder (born 1603)
date unknown
Johann Klemm, German organist and composer (born c.1593)
Johannes Praetorius, organist and composer (born 1595)

References

 
Music
17th century in music
Music by year